Fritz Klein (24 November 1888 – 13 December 1945) was an Austrian Nazi doctor and war criminal, hanged for his role in atrocities at Auschwitz concentration camp and Bergen-Belsen concentration camp during the Holocaust.

Early life and education
Klein was born in Feketehalom, Austria-Hungary (now Codlea in central Romania).

He studied medicine at the University of Budapest and completed his military service in Romania, finishing his studies in Budapest after World War I. He lived and worked as a doctor in Siebenbürgen (Transylvania), Romania.

In 1939, as a Romanian citizen, he was drafted into the Romanian army, where, after the outbreak of the war with the Soviet Union in 1941, he served as a paramedic on the eastern front. In May 1943, Romanian fascist dictator Marshal Antonescu, on a demand from Hitler to release ethnic Germans in the Romanian Army, drafted them into the German army. Hence Klein became a soldier in the Waffen-SS, was listed in the SS-Personalhauptamt, and posted to Yugoslavia.

Career
On 15 December 1943, he arrived in Auschwitz concentration camp, where at first he served as a camp doctor in the women’s camp in Birkenau. Subsequently, he worked as a camp doctor in the Gypsy camp. He also participated in numerous selections ("Selektionen") on the ramp. In December 1944 he was transferred to Neuengamme concentration camp, from where he was sent to Bergen-Belsen concentration camp in January 1945. He remained at the camp with commandant Josef Kramer and assisted in handing it over to British troops. Klein was imprisoned and forced to help bury all unburied corpses in mass graves. The British Army Film and Photographic Unit Number 5 photographed Klein standing in a mass grave, in a well-known 1945 photo (seen on the right).

In Auschwitz, when asked by Ella Lingens-Reiner how he reconciled his actions with his ethical obligations as a physician, Klein famously stated:"My Hippocratic oath tells me to cut a gangrenous appendix out of the human body. The Jews are the gangrenous appendix of mankind. That's why I cut them out."

Klein and 44 other camp staff were tried in the Belsen Trial by a British military court at Lüneburg. The trial lasted several weeks, from September to November 1945. During the trial Anita Lasker testified that Klein took part in selections for the gas chamber.

References

External links
 Fritz Klein (nazi)

Further reading 
Lifton, Robert Jay (1986). The Nazi doctors: medical killing and the psychology of genocide. Basic Books.

1945 deaths
1888 births
People from Codlea
People from the Kingdom of Hungary
Auschwitz concentration camp medical personnel
Physicians in the Nazi Party
Holocaust perpetrators in Poland
Neuengamme concentration camp personnel
Belsen trial executions
Austrian people executed abroad
Austro-Hungarian military personnel of World War I
Executed Romanian people
Executed Austrian Nazis
Romani genocide perpetrators
Waffen-SS personnel
Romanian military personnel of World War II
Executed mass murderers